The robust yellow bat (Scotophilus robustus) is a species of vesper bat. It is found only in Madagascar.

References

Scotophilus
Taxonomy articles created by Polbot
Mammals described in 1881
Bats of Africa
Taxa named by Henri Milne-Edwards